Reinhard von Bauer (born 23 February 1945) is a German diver. He competed in the men's 3 metre springboard event at the 1972 Summer Olympics.

References

External links
 

1945 births
Living people
German male divers
Olympic divers of West Germany
Divers at the 1972 Summer Olympics
People from Bernau bei Berlin
Sportspeople from Brandenburg
20th-century German people